Strange Flowers is a domestic novel written by Irish novelist Donal Ryan. It was first published in 2020 by Doubleday. It was voted Novel of the Year at the 2020 Irish Book Awards.

References 

2020 Irish novels
Novels by Donal Ryan
Doubleday (publisher) books